C. Mayer is a lunar impact crater that is located at the northern edge of the Mare Frigoris, due north of the prominent crater Aristoteles. Also to the south, but only a third as distant, is the smaller crater Sheepshanks. Due east of C. Mayer is the flooded crater Kane.

C. Mayer is a relatively young formation, with a sharp-edged and well-defined outer rim. The rim is not quite circular, and appears somewhat polygonal-shaped with outward bulges along the edge, most notably to the west. The inner walls have a terrace system and the interior is somewhat rough and irregular. The central peak lies just to the north of the midpoint, and extends in a northerly direction.

The lava-flooded formation C. Mayer D is attached to the southeastern rim of the crater, and a gap in the southeastern rim joins it to the Mare Frigoris. Thus the lunar mare extends up to the outer rampart of C. Mayer.

Satellite craters 
By convention these features are identified on lunar maps by placing the letter on the side of the crater midpoint that is closest to C. Mayer (See the C Mayer D crater that is very similar in shape to the map of Brazil). >> [(:pt:C. Mayer D (Cratera) )]

References 

 
 
 
 
 
 
 
 
 
 
 
 

Impact craters on the Moon